Lee Ji-young (also Lee Ji-yeong, ; born July 10, 1989) is a South Korean swimmer, who specialized in breaststroke events. She became the first female South Korean in history to train in the United States, and swim for the Peddie Aquatic Association in Hightstown, New Jersey.

As one of South Korea's youngest swimmers, Lee qualified for two swimming events at the 2004 Summer Olympics in Athens, by achieving FINA A-standard entry time of 2:31.32 (200 m breaststroke) from the Dong-A Swimming Tournament in Seoul. In the 100 m breaststroke, Lee challenged seven other swimmers on the third heat, including two-time Olympian İlkay Dikmen of Turkey. She edged out New Zealand's Annabelle Carey to take a seventh spot and thirty-third overall by 0.29 of a second in 1:12.93. In her second event, 200 m breaststroke, Lee placed twenty-fourth overall on the morning's preliminaries. Swimming in the final heat of five, she rounded out a field of seven swimmers to last place in 2:34.55, more than three seconds off her entry time.

References

External links
Player Bio – Penn Quakers

1989 births
Living people
South Korean female breaststroke swimmers
Olympic swimmers of South Korea
Swimmers at the 2004 Summer Olympics
Swimmers from Seoul
21st-century South Korean women